Philodromus albidus is a spider species found in Europe.

See also 
 List of Philodromidae species

References

External links 

albidus
Spiders of Europe
Spiders described in 1911